Elisabeth Terland (born 28 June 2001) is a Norwegian footballer who plays as a striker for Brighton & Hove Albion in the FA Women's Super League and the Norway national team.

Club career 
Terland started her career in Nærbø IL before she transferred to Bryne at the age of 13. At Bryne she played mostly at the boys' team at her age, but also got a few matches for the women's team, which played in the third division (the fourth level of Norwegian football). Before she turned 16, she was already considered one of the countries greatest talents at her age.

Klepp (2017–2020) 
In Desember 2016 it became official that Terland had signed for Klepp. At that point, she had already trained with the club for the entire previous season. At the age of 15, on 17 April 2017, she got her debut in Toppserien, the highest level in Norway. She started the match, which was the first of the season and against last year's winners LSK kvinner. The year after, in 2018, she played a role in Klepp getting an impressive silver medal in Toppserien.

In April 2019, Terland got an overuse injury. At that point she played for both Klepp's team in Toppserien and the U19 team, in addition to the U19 national team. She got back to play during the Fall, and her first match after the injury in Toppserien was 15 September 2019.

Despite the injury, she was named the greatest female talent in Norwegian football in 2019 in the Norwegian newspaper Aftenposten.

Sandviken/Brann (2021–2022) 
In November 2020, Sandviken announced that they had signed Terland and one of her teammates from Klepp, Tuva Hansen. Together they won Toppserien in 2021.

In January 2022, UEFA published a list over 10 female footballers to watch out for in 2022, which included Terland.

20 March 2022, Terland became the first player to score a goal in Toppserien for Brann's women's team, as the team changed from Sandviken to Brann before the 2022 season.

Brighton & Hove Albion (2022–) 
1 August 2022, Brighton & Hove Albion announced that Terland had signed a two-year contract with them.

International career
Terland has played matches for several Norway youth nation teams, including U15, U16, U17 and U19. In her first match with the U15-team against Sweden in 2015, she had two assists. In 2019, she was part of the team that took part in the UEFA Under-19 championship in Scotland.

In Oktober 2019, Terland was called up to the Norway national team for the first time. She made her debut for the Norway national team on 8 April 2021, coming on as a substitute for Amalie Eikeland against Belgium. Terland was part of the Norway national team during the Euro 2022.

International goals

References

2001 births
Living people
People from Hå
Women's association football midfielders
Norwegian women's footballers
Norway women's youth international footballers
Norway women's international footballers
Bryne FK players
Klepp IL players
SK Brann Kvinner players
Toppserien players
Sportspeople from Rogaland
UEFA Women's Euro 2022 players
Brighton & Hove Albion W.F.C. players